My Ambulance is a 2019 Thai drama series starring Davika Hoorne, Sunny Suwanmethanont, and Wongravee Nateetorn. It was aired on One31 from September 6 to October 26, 2019 and consisted of 16 episodes. The series was produced by Nadao Bangkok and  directed by Naruebet Kuno.

Plot
Peng (Sunny Suwanmethanont), an emergency center resident, and Tantawan (Davika Hoorne) have been in love for 15 years, mainly because they own a magical power between them which make Peng able to go to Tantawan when she calls him. One day, they got into a traffic accident and Tantawan is seriously injured. When she woke up, she lost her memory of the accident. Unbeknownst to her, the truth about the accident is hidden by Peng and all people around her. 
A young and heart-warming intern, Chalarm (Wongravee Nateetorn) appeared in her life and reminded her of the same feeling she once had for Peng. While her magical power with Peng has been weakening, Chalarm has started to have the magical power leading to her confusion - who is the one for her. During this time, Peng also met a new girl named Bamee (Kanyawee Songmuang), who has a crush on Peng and came to the hospital as an ambulance driver to get closer to him.

Cast

Main character
 Davika Hoorne as Tantawan
 Sawanya Paisarnpayak as young Tantawan
 Sunny Suwanmethanont as Peng
 Vachirawit Chiva-aree as young Peng
 Wongravee Nateetorn as Chalarm
 Kanyawee Songmuang as Bamee

Supporting character

 Putthipong “Billkin” Assaratanakul as Tao
 Krit Amnuaydechkorn as Tewkao
 Ponlawit Ketprapakorn as Whan
 Napat Chokejindachai as Lek
 Paweenut Panakorn as Tak
 Thiti Mahayotaruk as Tai
 Machida Sutthikulphanich as Kim

Cameo
 Lukkhana Siriwong as Peng's mother
 Nitmon Ladapornphiphan as girl with heart disease
 Buppa Suttisanon as Tantawan's mother
 Nophand Boonyai as Tantawan's father
 Varit Hongsananda as Chao
 Banjong Pisanthanakun as psychiatrist

Soundtrack
 Ice Paris & Pearwah Nichaphat - Rak Tit Siren (Love Siren) 
 Billkin - You Are My Everything 
 Sunny Suwanmethanont & Sky Wongravee - Love Message 
 Mai Davika - Tok Lum Rak (Heartbeat)
 Thanaerng Kanyawee - Mai Penrai Rok (It's OK) 
 Ice Paris - Rak Tit Siren (Love Siren) (Midnight Version) 
 Friday - Nao Ni (This Winter)
 Scrubb - Khao Kan Di (Well)
 Buachompoo Sahavat - Love Message

Awards and nominations

References

External links 

My Ambulance - Line TV
Nadao Series

Television series by Nadao Bangkok
2019 Thai television series debuts
2019 Thai television series endings
Thai television soap operas
One 31 original programming